Eid Mubarak is a 1965 Pakistani film, directed by S. M. Yusuf who also wrote the screenplay for the film story written by Fayyaz Hashmi. It features Waheed Murad, Zeba, Habib and Rukhsana in leading roles. The film had songs performed by Mala, Ahmed Rushdi and Munir Hussain and a Naat (by Mala) in the music composition of A. Hameed. The film performed well at the box office and was a silver jublee hit. It won a Nigar Award for Best sound editing.

Plot 
The plot revolves around the Eid festival and mutual love, brotherhood and mutual respect among the characters of a family after mutual suspicions.

The story revolves around a household where an elder brother lives with his younger siblings (a sister and a brother) as their parents have died. The elder brother, Azeem wants to marry one of his siblings and Tahira who is the daughter of Azeem's phuppo (parental aunt) likes him and wants to marry him. On the day of Eid-ul-Fitr, he learns that his brother Nadeem loves Naheed when he goes to her house. Naheed's father fist taunts Azeem because of his poverty but later, not only agrees for their marriage but also promises to marry his sister, Tahira, with a doctor he knows.

On Eid day, Tahira becomes victim of an accident which injures her leg and she starts to walk on crutches. Due to her lameness, the groom's family denies to marry her while Nadeem and Naheed get married. After the wedding, Azeem and Nadeem advise Naheed to take special care of Tahira.

One day, Azeem and Nadeem scold Naheed as they misunderstand that she doesn't take care of Tahira which upsets Naheed so much that she starts to hate Jameel's siblings. Another day, Anna Bi (Naheed's servant) knocks Tahira down unknowingly that she would fall. Azeem sees it all and blames Anna Bi which Nadeem furiously denies and slaps Tahira. Nadeem becomes distant from his siblings and does not embrace his brother after prayer of Eid-ul-Azha and then leaves for Naheed's father's house along with her. Zahida also shifts to the city with her mother due to her job, leaving Naheed and Azeem alone.

Naheed's father arranges a party and invites Azeem and Tahira also, who come but later leave when Naheed insults them. The party is arranged to announce that all of Naheed's father business and property will be inherited by Nadeem. At this party, her father's secretary arrives with police who arrest her father as he owns a business of counterfeit drugs. Police is about to arrest the secretary as well because he was equally involved in this unlawful evil act but he escapes and shoots Naheed's father and himself is shot by police. Nadeem is then arrested by police due to his father-in-law's crime and Naheed is left alone. Azeem and Tahira have a road accident and Tahira becomes lost when she seeks a doctor. As Tahira also doesn't find her brother, so she takes shelter at the doctor's house. She goes to 'mailad' in doctor's neighborhood which was actually arranged by Zahid, who lives with her mother and has also brought Naheed to her as she was alone. Azeem goes to police station to report about her sister and meets with Nadeem there. He comes home with Nadeem and finds Tahira too. Nadeem needs some money for Nadeem's bail which he takes from his uncle who has not inherited his father's property to his siblings. Nadeem is released from jail and Azeem marries Zahida while the doctor marries Tahira as he feels that he has done wrong with Tahira.

Cast 
 Waheed Murad as Nadeem
 Zeba as Naheed
 Habib as Azeem
 Rukhsana
 Iqbal Yusuf
 Nirala
 Seema
 Kemal Irani
 Faizi
 Adeeb

Soundtrack

Release and response 
Eid Mubarak was released on 2 July 1965 on the occasion of Eid. The film ran for 18 weeks in the cinemas of Karachi and was a Silver Jubilee hit.

Awards and nominations 
 1965 - Nigar Awards - Best Sound Editing - Hashim Quraishi

References 

1965 films
Pakistani romantic drama films
1960s Urdu-language films
Nigar Award winners
Urdu-language Pakistani films
Pakistani black-and-white films

External links